This is a list of Women's Tennis Association (WTA) records since its inception in June 1973. Some records additionally extend back a few more years in order to include the immediately preceding Virginia Slims Circuit era for completeness. The Virginia Slims Circuit started in September 1970 and was replaced in 1973 by the WTA. These however do not make up the entire Open Era records (1968 – present). For those, see Open Era tennis records – Women's singles.

Grand Slam tournaments

Titles and finals 

|

|

|

Most titles / finals at a single tournament

Most titles won in a season in Open Era

Consecutive records 

 Active streaks in bold

Sources: Except for the information concerning active players, the source for the all-time table is the '2014 Sony Ericsson WTA Tour Official Guide'. Court and Wade began their careers and were winning tournaments long before the Open Era started in 1968; therefore, the statistics shown above do not reflect their entire careers. For example, Billie Jean King career statistics lists 129 career singles titles for King.

Match wins

Matches won on all surfaces

Match wins per court type 

|}

{|
|- valign="top"
|

Winning percentages

Career winning percentage 

 Note that the figures below represent career winning percentages of players that are retired (regular font) as well as current active players (boldface). The latter are subject to change and do not reflect the final figure.

Single season winning percentage

Winning streaks

Year-end Championships

Premier Mandatory & Premier 5 level records (since inception as "Tier One" in 1988) 

 Only tournaments of Premier mandatory and Premier 5 and their predecessor (Tier 1) level tournament records are included.
 Tier one tournaments were played on 3 surfaces, one of which (carpet) ceased to be used from around 1995.

Titles by court type

WTA rankings (since 3 November 1975) 

  
 Bold font denotes active players or currently active consecutive streaks

|

|

Youngest WTA No. 1

Oldest WTA No. 1

Most career singles wins over world No. 1 

This table lists the players with the most career singles wins over the world No. 1 ranked player since the Women's Tennis Association began computerized rankings on November 3, 1975.

Source: 2012 WTA Media Guide, compiled by the Sony Ericsson WTA Tour, page 178.
Updated: Nov. 30, 2020

Lowest-ranked players to defeat world No. 1 

This table lists the lowest-ranked players to defeat world No. 1 ranked player since the Women's Tennis Association began computerized rankings on November 3, 1975. (Not including matches in which No.1-ranked player retired.)

Lowest-ranked players to win a singles title 
The following table lists players ranked 200 and lower, that have won a WTA title.

WTA Tour doubles career records

Most doubles titles won

Other selected achievements

Youngest winners of a singles title 
Only the first tournament won by each player is listed.

Oldest winners of a singles title 
Only the last tournament won by each player is listed.

Longest gap between titles

WTA career prize money leaders 
 Top 15 Career Prize Money Leaders :
 Top 15 YTD Money Leaders :

 
Since September 1970:
 488 players have earned at least US$1 million.
 283 players have earned at least US$2 million.
 138 players have earned at least US$5 million.
 63 players have earned at least US$10 million.
 33 players have earned at least US$15 million.
 22 players have earned at least US$20 million.
 10 players have earned at least US$25 million.
 8 players have earned at least US$30 million.
 3 players have earned at least US$40 million.
 1 player has earned at least US$50 million.

See also 

 Lists of tennis records and statistics
 All-time tennis records – Women's singles
 Open Era tennis records – Women's singles
 WTA Finals
 List of WTA number 1 ranked singles tennis players
 List of WTA number 1 ranked doubles tennis players
 List of female tennis players
 WTA Awards
 List of tennis tournaments
 Grand Slam (tennis)
 All-time tennis records – Men's singles
 Open Era tennis records – Men's singles
 List of tennis players career achievements
 ATP Tour records

References

External links 
 https://web.archive.org/web/20220919121916/http://www.sonyericssonwtatour.com/SEWTATour-Archive/Archive/MediaInfo/mediaguide2012.pdf
 https://web.archive.org/web/20120106042844/http://www.wtatennis.com/SEWTATour-Archive/Rankings_Stats/life_hard_sgl.pdf
 https://web.archive.org/web/20151017070524/http://www.wtatennis.com/SEWTATour-Archive/Rankings_Stats/life_clay_sgl.pdf
 https://web.archive.org/web/20120106021102/http://www.wtatennis.com/SEWTATour-Archive/Rankings_Stats/life_grass_sgl.pdf
 https://web.archive.org/web/20120105165445/http://www.wtatennis.com/SEWTATour-Archive/Rankings_Stats/life_carpet_sgl.pdf
 http://www.wtachampionships.com/SEWTATour-Archive/Archive/TournamentStats/2011/808_bythenumbers.pdf
 https://web.archive.org/web/20120105204419/http://www.wtatennis.com/SEWTATour-Archive/Rankings_Stats/life_wl_sgl.pdf

Records
Tennis records and statistics